Lichfield Cathedral is an Anglican cathedral in Lichfield, Staffordshire, England, one of only three cathedrals in the United Kingdom with three spires (together with Truro Cathedral and St Mary's Cathedral in Edinburgh), and the only medieval one of the three. It is the cathedral of the Diocese of Lichfield, which covers Staffordshire, much of Shropshire, and parts of the Black Country and West Midlands. It is the seat of the  Bishop of Lichfield, currently Michael Ipgrave, who was appointed in 2016. It is a Grade I listed building.

Overview
The cathedral is dedicated to St Chad and Saint Mary. The stone is sandstone and came from a quarry on the south side of Lichfield. The walls of the nave lean outwards slightly, due to the weight of stone used in the ceiling vaulting; some 200–300 tons of which was removed during renovation work to prevent the walls leaning further.

Lichfield suffered severe damage during the English Civil War in which all of the stained glass was destroyed. In spite of this the windows of the Lady Chapel contain some of the finest medieval Flemish painted glass in existence. Dating from the 1530s it came from the Abbey of Herkenrode in Belgium, in 1801, having been purchased by Brooke Boothby when that abbey was dissolved during the Napoleonic Wars. It was sold on to the cathedral for the same price. There are also some fine windows by Betton and Evans (1819), and many fine late 19th century windows, particularly those by Charles Eamer Kempe.

The Lichfield Gospels, also known as the Book of Chad, are the gospels of Matthew and Mark, and the early part of Luke, written mainly in Latin with some text in early Welsh and dating from around 730. There were originally two volumes but one went missing around the time of the English Civil War. It is closely related in style to the Lindisfarne Gospels. The manuscript is on display in the Chapter House from Easter to Christmas.

The Cathedral Close is one of the most complete in the country and includes a medieval courtyard which once housed the men of the choir. The three spires are often referred to as the "Ladies of the Vale".

History of the cathedral

Early history and elevation to Archbishopric
When Chad was made Bishop of Mercia in 669, he moved his see from Repton to Lichfield, possibly because this was already a holy site, as the scene of martyrdoms during the Roman period. The first cathedral to be built on the present site was in 700, when Bishop Headda built a new church to house the bones of St Chad, which had become a sacred shrine to many pilgrims when he died in 672. Offa, King of Mercia, seemed to resent his own bishops paying allegiance to the Archbishop of Canterbury in Kent who, whilst under Offa's control, was not of his own kingdom of Mercia. Offa therefore created his own archbishopric in Lichfield, who presided over all the bishops from the Humber to the Thames. All this began in 786, with the consent of Pope Adrian. The Pope's official representatives were received warmly by Offa and were present at the Council of Chelsea (787), often called 'the contentious synod', where it was proposed that the Archbishopric of Canterbury be restricted in order to make way for Offa's new archbishop. It was vehemently opposed, but Offa and the papal representatives defeated Archbishop Jaenbert, installing Higbert as the new Archbishop of Lichfield. Pope Adrian sent Higbert the pallium, denoting his support for this move. In gratitude, Offa promised to send an annual shipment of gold to the pope for alms and supplying the lights in St. Peter's church in Rome. However, The Archbishopric of Lichfield lasted for only 16 years, ending soon after Offa's death, when it was restored to Archbishop Aethelheard of Canterbury.

Starting in 1085 and continuing through the twelfth century the original wooden Saxon church was replaced by a Norman cathedral made from stone, and this was in turn replaced by the present Gothic cathedral begun in 1195. It was completed by the building of the Lady Chapel in the 1330s. The Choir dates from 1200, the Transepts from 1220 to 1240 and the Nave was started in 1260. The octagonal Chapter House, which was completed in 1249 and is one of the most beautiful parts of the cathedral with some charming stone carvings, houses an exhibition of the cathedral's greatest treasure, the Lichfield Gospels, an 8th-century illuminated manuscript.

Devastation of the English Civil War
There were three great sieges of Lichfield during the period 1643–1646 as the cathedral close was surrounded by a ditch and defensive walls, which made it a natural fortress. The cathedral authorities with a certain following were for Charles I, but the townsfolk generally sided with Parliament, and this led to the fortification of the close in 1643. Robert Greville, 2nd Baron Brooke, led an assault against it, but was killed by a deflected bullet from John Dyott (known as 'dumb' because he was a deaf mute) who along with his brother Richard Dyott had taken up a position on the battlements of the central cathedral spire on 2 March 1643. Brooke's deputy John Gell, took over the siege. The Royalist garrison surrendered to Gell two days later.

In April of the same year (1643) Prince Rupert led an Royalist expeditionary force from Oxford to recapture Lichfield. The siege started on 8 April. During the second assault Rupert's engineers detonated what is thought to be the first explosive mine to be used in England to breach the defences. Unable to defend the Close, Colonel Russell, the parliamentary commander of the garrison, surrendered on terms to Rupert on 21 April.

The cathedral suffered extensive damage: the central spire was demolished, the roofs ruined and all the stained glass smashed. Bishop Hacket began the restoration of the cathedral in the 1660s, aided by substantial funds donated by the restored monarch, but it was not until the 19th century that the damage caused by the Civil War was fully repaired. Up until the 19th century, on top of an ornamented gable, between the two spires, stood a colossal figure of Charles II, by William Wilson. Today it stands just outside the south doors.

Victorian restoration
Although the 18th century was a golden age for the City of Lichfield, it was a period of decay for the cathedral. The 15th-century library, on the north side of the nave, was pulled down and the books moved to their present location above the Chapter House. Most of the statues on the west front were removed and the stonework covered with Roman cement. At the end of the century James Wyatt organised some major structural work, removing the High Altar to make one worship area of Choir and Lady Chapel and adding a massive stone screen at the entrance to the Choir. Francis Eginton painted the east window and was commissioned by the chapter to do other work in the cathedral.

The ornate west front was extensively renovated in the Victorian era by George Gilbert Scott. It includes a remarkable number of ornate carved figures of kings, queens and saints, working with original materials where possible and creating fine new imitations and additions when the originals were not available. Between 1877 and 1884 the empty niches on the west front were given new statues, most carved by Robert Bridgeman of Lichfield: the statue of Queen Victoria on the north side of the central window was carved by her daughter, Princess Louise.

Wyatt's choir-screen had utilised medieval stone-work which Scott in turn used to create the clergy's seats in the sanctuary. The new metal screen by Francis Skidmore and John Birnie Philip to designs by Scott himself is a triumph of High Victorian art, as are the fine Mintons tiles in the choir, inspired by the medieval ones found in the Choir foundations and still seen in the Library.

Lichfield Angel

In February 2003, an eighth-century sculpted panel of the Archangel Gabriel was discovered under the nave of the cathedral. The 600mm tall panel is carved from limestone, and originally was part of a stone chest, which is thought to have contained the relics of St Chad. The panel was broken into three parts but was still otherwise intact and had traces of red pigment from the period. The pigments on the Lichfield Angel correspond closely to those of the Lichfield Gospels which have been dated to around 730AD. The Angel was first unveiled to the public in 2006, when visitor numbers to the cathedral trebled. After being taken to Birmingham for eighteen months for examination, it is now exhibited in the cathedral.

COVID-19 pandemic 
On Friday 15 January 2021, while closed to services during the COVID-19 pandemic, Lichfield Cathedral became the first place of worship in England to accommodate the vaccination programme in the United Kingdom.

Shrine of St Chad 
On the 7 and 8 November 2022 a new shrine to St Chad was consecrated and a relic of the saint was translated from St Chad's Cathedral, Birmingham, at two separate services.

Dean and chapter
As of 7 December 2020:

 Dean: Adrian Dorber (since 24 September 2005 installation)
 Canon Precentor: Andrew Stead (Canon since September 2013; Precentor since Easter 2017; previously Treasurer and school chaplain)
 Canon Custos: Jan McFarlane (Canon Residentiary and honorary assistant bishop since 3 April 2020)
 Canon Chancellor: Gregory Platten (since 5 July 2020 collation)
 Canon Treasurer: David Primrose (since 2021)

The additional role of Vice Dean has been vacant since Anthony Moore's resignation in 2017.

Lay Chapter
 Bryan Ramsell
 Anne Parkhill
 Margaret Harding
 Peter Durrant

Music

Organists
Notable organists of Lichfield Cathedral include the 17th-century composer Michael East, and the musical educator and choral conductor William Henry Harris who conducted at the coronations of both Elizabeth II and George VI

Priest Vicars Choral
 The Precentor's Vicar: Vacant
 The Dean's Vicar: Vacant
 The Chancellor's Vicar: Vacant
 The Treasurer's Vicar: Vacant

Lay Vicars Choral and Choristers
The Choir has eight Lay Vicars Choral on staff and in 2021 reduced the full time equivalents from 9 to 6. In the front rows Lichfield has 18 boy Choristers and up to 18 girl Choristers.

Burials

 Chad of Mercia, Bishop of the Northumbrians, later Bishop of the Mercians and Lindsey People, and Saint (c. 634–672) — originally buried in the Church of Saint Mary which became part of the cathedral. Relics moved to St Chad's Cathedral Birmingham
 Geoffrey de Muschamp, Bishop of Coventry (1198–1208)
 William de Cornhill, Bishop of Coventry (1214–1223)
 Alexander de Stavenby, Bishop of Coventry and Lichfield (1224–1238)
 Hugh de Pateshull, Bishop of Coventry and Lichfield (1239–1241)
 Roger Weseham, Bishop of Coventry and Lichfield (1245–1256)
 Walter Langton, Lord High Treasurer of England and Bishop of Coventry and Lichfield (1296–1321)
 Henry Paget, 1st Marquess of Anglesey, KG, GCB, GCH, PC (1768- 1854), cavalry officer during the Battle of Waterloo.
 George Augustus Selwyn, Bishop of Lichfield (1868–1878), first Anglican Bishop of New Zealand (1841–1858) and Primate of New Zealand (1858–1868)

See also

 Architecture of the medieval cathedrals of England
 Bishops of Lichfield
 English Gothic architecture
 Lichfield Cathedral School
 Lichfield Gospels
 List of cathedrals in the United Kingdom
 List of Grade I listed buildings in Staffordshire
 Grade I listed churches in Staffordshire
 Listed buildings in Lichfield
 List of the Bishops of the Diocese of Lichfield and its precursor offices
 Mercian Trail

Citations

General references

External links

 Lichfield Cathedral website
 Manuscripts of Lichfield Cathedral—Digital facsimiles of the St Chad Gospels and Cathedral's Wycliffe New Testament; includes overlay viewer, multispectral images, historical images (going back to 1887), collation, and presently sixteen interactive 3D and RTI renderings—University of Oklahoma

 
Anglican cathedrals in England
Anglo-Saxon cathedrals
Burial sites of the House of Icel
Churches in Lichfield
Diocese of Lichfield
English Gothic architecture in Staffordshire
Grade I listed cathedrals
Grade I listed churches in Staffordshire
Pre-Reformation Roman Catholic cathedrals
Tourist attractions in Staffordshire